Julnar

Julnar, a character from Arabian Nights, also known as The Seaborn, the heroine of nights 738–756.
Julnar of the Sea, ballet choreographed by Ted Shawn
Julnar (ship), paddle steamer sunk in the Mesopotamian campaign
Julnar (crater), named after the character